Vega (pronounced ) is a Spanish surname that means "dweller in the meadow", or "one who lives on the plain". Other versions of the surname Vega are Vegas or Vegaz.

Geographical distribution
As of 2014, 25.9% of all known bearers of the surname Vega were residents of Mexico (frequency 1:425), 9.6% of Colombia (1:442), 9.2% of the United States (1:3,476), 8.8% of Argentina (1:432), 7.9% of Peru (1:356), 6.0% of Spain (1:685), 5.7% of Chile (1:272), 3.9% of Puerto Rico (1:80), 3.5% of Cuba (1:294), 3.1% of Ecuador (1:454), 3.0% of Costa Rica (1:141), 2.0% of Panama (1:178), 1.7% of the Philippines (1:5,213), 1.6% of Paraguay (1:403), 1.5% of Venezuela (1:1,777), 1.4% of Bolivia (1:686) and 1.2% of Nicaragua (1:454).

In Spain, the frequency of the surname was higher than national average (1:685) in the following autonomous communities:
 1. Canary Islands (1:216)
 2. Asturias (1:221)
 3. Cantabria (1:335)
 4. Castile and León (1:381)
 5. Ceuta (1:473)
 6. Andalusia (1:510)
 7. Extremadura (1:557)

In Puerto Rico, the frequency of the surname was higher than national average (1:80) in the following municipalities:

 1. Quebradillas (1:6)
 2. Coamo (1:10)
 3. Corozal (1:11)
 4. Naranjito (1:11)
 5. Comerío (1:12)
 6. Aibonito (1:14)
 7. Barranquitas (1:14)
 8. Maunabo (1:14)
 9. Santa Isabel (1:15)
 10. Orocovis (1:15)
 11. Salinas (1:17)
 12. Guayama (1:19)
 13. Patillas (1:20)
 14. Arroyo (1:21)
 15. Isabela (1:37)
 16. Camuy (1:44)
 17. Hormigueros (1:66)
 18. Sabana Grande (1:73)
 19. Florida (1:78)
 20. Rincón (1:78)
 21. Mayagüez (1:79)

People
 Alan Vega (1938–2016), American singer for the duo Suicide
 Alexa PenaVega (née Vega; born 1988), Colombian American actress and singer
 Amelia Vega (born 1984), Miss Universe 2003 from the Dominican Republic
 Cecilia Vega (born 1977), American journalist, correspondent and anchor for ABC News
 Conrado Vega (1938–2010), American politician and educator
 Edgardo Vega Yunqué (1936–2008), Puerto Rican novelist, also known as Ed Vega
 Gil Vega (1914-1996), Costa Rican orchestra director and musician (Gilberto Vega Cascante)
 Hugo Gutiérrez Vega (1934–2015), Mexican poet, lawyer, writer, academic, actor and translator
 Janine Pommy Vega (1942–2010), American poet
José Antonio Rodríguez Vega (1957–2002), Spanish serial killer
 Judah Vega, 17th century rabbi in Amsterdam
 Julie Vega, stage name of Filipino singer and actress Julie Pearl Apostol Postigo (born 1968)
 Jurij Vega (1754–1802), Slovene mathematician, physicist and artillery officer
 Lope de Vega (1562–1635), Spanish playwright
 Little Louie Vega (born 1965), American DJ, record producer and mixer
 Luis Vega (mathematician) (born 1960), Spanish mathematician
 Luis Vega Ramos (born 1965), Puerto Rican lawyer and politician
 Lydia de Vega (born 1964), Filipino athlete at the 1984 and 1988 Olympics
 Makenzie Vega (born 1994), American actress
 Mariana Vega (born 1985), Venezuelan singer-songwriter
 Óscar Vega (boxer) (born 1965), Spanish boxer at the 1992 Olympics
 Paulina Vega (born 1993), Colombian  television host, beauty pageant title holder, Miss Universe 2014
 Paz Vega (born 1976), Spanish actress
 Silverio Vega (born 1956), Mayor of West New York, New Jersey
 Suzanne Vega (born 1959), American songwriter and singer (stepdaughter of Edgardo)
 Tanzina Vega, American journalist
 Táta Vega (born 1951), American vocalist
 Tim Vega (1965–2002), American graphic designer (son of Edgardo)

Fictional characters 
Tori Vega from VICTORiOUS
Trina Vega from  VICTORiOUS
Vincent Vega from Pulp Fiction
Victor “Mr. Blonde” Vega from Reservoir Dogs
Vega from Street Fighter

See also
Veiga (disambiguation), Portuguese variant
De la Vega (disambiguation), Spanish variant

References

Surnames of Spanish origin
Spanish-language surnames